Ranjan Prasad Yadav was a member of the 15th Lok Sabha of India. Yadav represented the Pataliputra constituency of Bihar and is a member of the Janata Dal (United) political party.

Education and background
Educated at Science College in Patna University, Yadav has accomplished Doctorate after completing MSc in geology. He then worked as a Professor before joining politics.

Positions held

See also
List of members of the 15th Lok Sabha of India

References

External links 

India MPs 2009–2014
Living people
1945 births
Patna University alumni
Politicians from Patna
Lok Sabha members from Bihar
Rajya Sabha members from Bihar
Janata Dal (United) politicians
Candidates in the 2014 Indian general election
Rashtriya Janata Dal politicians
Janata Dal politicians
People from Patna